Sergeant William Lloyd Nelson (February 22, 1918–April 24, 1943) was an American combat soldier who was posthumously awarded the Medal of Honor, the nation's highest decoration for valor, for his actions on April 24, 1943, during World War II.

Nelson was born in Delaware, on February 22, 1918. Drafted into the United States Army in January 1941, he trained at Fort Dix, New Jersey.

Nelson was killed in action during the final weeks of the Tunisian campaign while serving as a sergeant and a member of the 2nd Battalion, 60th Infantry Regiment, part of the 9th Infantry Division. Nelson is interred at Silverbrook Cemetery in Wilmington, Delaware

Medal of Honor
His Medal of Honor citation read as follows:

For conspicuous gallantry and intrepidity at risk of life, above and beyond the call of duty in action involving actual conflict at Djebel Dardys, northwest of Sedjenane, Tunisia. On the morning of April 24, 1943, Sgt. NELSON led his section of heavy mortars to a forward position where he placed his guns and men. Under intense enemy artillery, mortar, and small-arms fire, he advanced alone to a chosen observation position from which he directed the laying of a concentrated mortar barrage which successfully halted an initial enemy counterattack. Although mortally wounded in the accomplishment of his mission, and with his duty clearly completed, Sgt. NELSON crawled to a still more advanced observation point and continued to direct the fire of his section. Dying of hand grenade wounds and only 50 yards from the enemy, Sgt. NELSON encouraged his section to continue their fire and by doing so they took a heavy toll of enemy lives. The skill which Sgt. NELSON displayed in this engagement, his courage, and self-sacrificing devotion to duty and heroism resulting in the loss of his life, was a priceless inspiration to our Armed Forces and were in keeping with the highest tradition of the U.S. Army.|William Nelson, United States Army

Namings
 The US Army Barracks in Neu-Ulm, Germany was named after Sgt. Nelson. 
 A liberty ship was named after him (?)
 The Middletown, Delaware National Guard armory
 A housing project at Fort Dix, New Jersey
 A recreational center at Fort Lewis, Washington
 VFW Post #3792, Middletown, Delaware

See also

List of Medal of Honor recipients for World War II

References

United States Army Medal of Honor recipients
United States Army personnel killed in World War II
1943 deaths
1918 births
World War II recipients of the Medal of Honor
United States Army soldiers
People from Dover, Delaware
Military personnel from Delaware
Burials in New Castle County, Delaware